Cousya is a genus of beetles belonging to the family Staphylinidae.

The genus was first described by Mulsant and Rey.

Synonym: Chilomorpha Krasa, 1914

The species of this genus are found in Europe.

Species:
 Cousya ajmonis (Bernhauer, 1934)
 Cousya longitarsis (Thomson, 1867)

References

Staphylinidae
Staphylinidae genera